Searchlights is the first full-length album by Christian rock band Abandon. The album was released on August 25, 2009 through ForeFront Records.

Background

Abandon had released two full-length albums as an independent band (Ambush and Who You Are), before being signed to Christian music label, ForeFront Records in 2007. Since being signed to ForeFront Records, Abandon has released two EPs, which feature songs that are on Searchlights. The first single off their first EP, "Providence", reached #7 on R&R's Christian rock charts. The song "Hold On", originally released as a single, was #1 for multiple weeks.

Track listing (U.S.)

Track listing (Japan)

Awards

In 2010, the album was nominated for a Dove Award for Rock Album of the Year at the 41st GMA Dove Awards.

Personnel
 Josh Engler- lead vocals
 Justin Engler- rhythm guitar
 Stevan Vela- lead guitar
 Bryan Fowler- bass
 Dave Vela- drums

References

External links
Abandon's official website

2009 albums
Abandon (band) albums